Show Me the Money is a British topical debate programme that aired on BBC. The shows typically featured three top bosses and entrepreneurs who debated about who was making money and how they were doing it. This series began on 31 October 2010 and ended on 24 February 2013. It was shown on BBC News at 9:30 pm on Sundays.

External links

References 

BBC television news shows
BBC World News shows
2010 British television series debuts
2013 British television series endings
British television news shows
Business-related television series in the United Kingdom